Asian Private Banker is an Asia-based intelligence, data and connections company which focuses on Asia's private wealth management communities.

History
Asian Private Banker was founded in November 2009.

The region's main event to focus on the private banking advisory community is the 10th APB Summit (formerly Investment Advisory Summit). First held in Hong Kong in June 2010, it led to a sister event in Singapore in October 2010, and the two events have since been held annually. A range of industry functions and thought-leadership events are now hosted annually by Asian Private Banker.

Asian Private Banker released its first Asia AUM (Assets Under Management) League Table for the top 20 private banks in Asia in April 2012, followed by the Asia RM (Relationship Managers) Headcount League Table. These league tables are updated annually (in March) and are a result of investigative journalism and data collation. Asian Private Banker's AUM and RM League Tables are used by Bloomberg, Financial Times, Reuters, The Business Times.

Asian Private Banker's first Awards for Distinction was held in 2011. The Awards Gala Dinner, held in February each year, is a gathering of key figures in Asia's private banking community.

Audience

The magazine and website are aimed at relationship managers, C-suite management at private banks, and specialists in charge of product selection. The majority of the readership is based in the two main off-shore booking centres: Hong Kong and Singapore, with a smaller following in China, the UK, Switzerland, and the US.

Content

Digital
The website provides daily digital content and news articles, as well as an archive of previously published content, paralleled by daily e-newsletters and a news app (APB News).

Print
Asian Private Banker's print magazine is the only Asia-produced magazine focusing exclusively on private banking and wealth management, with lead feature articles on industry issues, regular columns and a compilation of articles from the website during that period.

Data and Research
Asian Private Banker conducts incisive proprietary research on private banks, their product providers, and the various UHNW/HNW clients they serve, as well as provide AUM (assets under management) and RM (relationship managers) League Tables, cited by industry sources as the most reliable of their kind, and the magazine is now using its network within the industry to build its data offering.

See also

 Business Journalism
 List of newspapers in Hong Kong
 Periodical publication

References

2009 establishments in Hong Kong
Business magazines
Economy of Hong Kong
Magazines established in 2009